Jason Wynne McAteer (born 18 June 1971) is a former professional footballer. His primary position was in centre midfield, though he was also an able right winger and full-back.

During his professional career from 1992 to 2007, McAteer played for five clubs, Bolton Wanderers, Liverpool, Blackburn Rovers, Sunderland and finally Tranmere Rovers. His transfer fees added up to £9.5 million. Born in England, he represented the Republic of Ireland national team at international level, winning 52 international caps and playing at the World Cup in 1994 and 2002.

Club career

Bolton Wanderers
McAteer was born in Birkenhead on the Wirral. His family were shaken by the closure of the shipyards in the 1980s, and he began the 1990s in a state of unemployment.  McAteer got his big break aged 20, at local non-league team Marine, when impressing for Marine Reserves against the Bolton Wanderers A team in 1992. He had no contract with Marine, and Bolton purchased the young midfielder for £500 plus a large bag of footballs. He made his first team debut against Burnley in a Division Two game at Burnden Park on 28 November 1992, finishing on the winning side in a 4–0 triumph. He made a total of 21 appearances in the 1992–93 season for Bolton, who finished the season as runners-up and secured promotion to Division One. Bolton were FA Cup quarter-finalists in the 1993–94 season and achieved a comfortable position in Division One. During the 1994–95 season, Bolton reached the final of the Football League Cup (their first appearance in a major cup final for 37 years), but lost 2–1 to Liverpool.

McAteer and his colleagues returned to Wembley the following month on 29 May 1995, as they reached the final of the Division One playoffs having finished third in the league. Their opponents on this occasion were Reading. Reading took a 2–0 lead in the first half and led the match until the 86th minute when Bolton scored a late equaliser to make the game 2–2 and force extra-time. Bolton went on to win the match 4–3 after extra time, and McAteer was given his first chance of FA Premier League football.

Liverpool
Early in the 1995–96 season, McAteer joined Liverpool in a £4.5 million deal after he played against them in the 1995 Football League Cup Final for Bolton. He came close to joining Blackburn Rovers in 1995, but when Liverpool declared an interest, McAteer decided to sign for the team he had supported as a boy and turned down the then Blackburn manager Kenny Dalglish. He made his Liverpool debut on 16 September 1995 in a 3–0 win against Blackburn at Anfield, coming on as a late substitute for John Barnes.	
	
During his time at Anfield, McAteer also filled in at right back for certain spells despite being primarily a central midfielder. He broke his leg whilst playing against Blackburn at Anfield on 31 January 1998.	
He made a full recovery and on his return to the first team scored two goals against West Ham United on 2 May 1998.	
He played in the 1996 FA Cup Final against Manchester United in which Liverpool lost to a single goal scored by Eric Cantona.
In total he made 139 appearances for Liverpool, scoring six goals over four seasons.

McAteer was part of the group of 1990s Liverpool players known as the "Spice Boys" for the tabloid attention towards their private lives. Other players named in this group included Robbie Fowler, Steve McManaman and Jamie Redknapp.

Blackburn Rovers
Blackburn Rovers manager Brian Kidd signed McAteer for £4 million on 27 January 1999. He signed a four-year contract with wages of £20,000 a week. Rovers were relegated that season, but McAteer would help the club to promotion back to the Premiership in 2001 during his second full season with the club. During his time with Rovers, McAteer had a vicious argument one day with manager Graeme Souness, and said of him in 2002: "He almost ruined my career and I cannot help but despise him for it."

Sunderland
Souness sold McAteer to Sunderland for £1 million in October 2001, on a three-year deal. He made 27 appearances that season, but was unable to prevent the Black Cats' relegation to the First Division the following season. After a double abdominal hernia operation, he played only five times between September 2002 and December 2003. In his first game back on 13 December, he took just four minutes to score away to West Ham United, albeit in a 3–2 loss. He played both legs of the play-off semi-final against Crystal Palace in May 2004 before being released at the end of the year.

Tranmere Rovers
In July 2004, McAteer was close to a one-year deal at newly relegated Leicester City, which was called off due to unforeseen circumstances. Days later, he signed a two-year deal with Tranmere Rovers, hoping to play out his career with his hometown club. He trained as a coach ready to embark on a career in that department after his retirement. He was made club captain by manager Brian Little, skippering the side to the League One play-off semi-finals, where they eventually lost on penalties to Hartlepool United.

He was released by Tranmere Rovers in May 2007 and announced his retirement shortly afterwards. On 15 June 2009, he was appointed assistant manager to former Liverpool teammate John Barnes at Tranmere. On 9 October, the pair were sacked after a run of just two league wins from 11 games.

International career
McAteer qualified to play for Republic of Ireland through his grandfather who was born in County Down. He was capped 52 times between 1994 and 2004 making his debut on 23 March 1994 in a 0-0 draw against Russia in a friendly match at Lansdowne Road and was selected by manager Jack Charlton for the Republic's 1994 World Cup squad. McAteer came on as a substitute in Ireland's 1–0 group stage victory over Italy on 18 June.

McAteer played in his second World Cup  in 2002. He scored the decisive goal for the Irish in a 1–0 World Cup qualifying win against the Netherlands on 1 September 2001, which helped Ireland stay on course for their place in the 2002 World Cup.

Mcateer was critical of Roy Keane after the Saipan Incident at the 2002 World Cup, saying "Everything is black or white with Roy, there is no such colour as grey. I do not always understand his rage." McAteer said that when they clashed during Sunderland's match against Manchester United in August 2002, he had said to Keane: "Put it all in your next book". Keane responded by elbowing McAteer on the side of the head.

Personal life
McAteer was nicknamed "Trigger", after an Only Fools and Horses character of low intelligence. He said in 2005 that he cultivated this image in order to play more matches, as managers would be comfortable putting him in different positions. Anecdotes spread about McAteer's purported low intelligence, including that he had asked for a pizza to be cut into four pieces and not eight because he was not hungry; he confirmed in 2005 that this story is true.

McAteer released an autobiography, Blood, Sweat & Jason McAteer, in 2017. In it, he said that he struggled with depression and thoughts of suicide after his football career ended.

McAteer married his first wife, Kristina Delaney, at Slane Castle in 2001. In October 2013, he married Lucy Edwards in Limerick with the reception at Dromoland Castle. His brother-in-law is his ex Liverpool team-mate, Steve McManaman, who married Lucy Edwards' older sister, Victoria, in 2002. McAteer said that while he was at the 2022 UEFA Champions League final with LFC TV, his wife Lucy and 22-year-old son were assaulted and robbed amidst the chaos.

Endorsements
McAteer featured in EA Sports' FIFA video game series; he was on the cover for the International edition of FIFA Soccer 96, alongside Frank de Boer.

In 1997, McAteer featured in a Wash & Go shampoo advert, for which he was reportedly paid £40,000.

Post-playing career

McAteer has regularly appeared for the Liverpool legends who play in various charity games around the world. In March 2005, he recruited friends from football and showbusiness for Tsunami Soccer Aid which generated over half a million pounds for Save the Children, helping survivors of the 2004 Indian Ocean earthquake and tsunami.  In May 2008, he visited Banda Aceh in Indonesia to see how the money had been used.

In 2006, McAteer became an investor in Golf Punk magazine, alongside former Sunderland teammates Phil Babb, Michael Gray, Thomas Sørensen and Stephen Wright, saving the publication from closure.

In April 2011, while participating in a charity football match between Darndale F.C. and Liverpool/Manchester United Legends in aid of Autism Ireland, McAteer clashed with Dublin GAA goalkeeper Stephen Cluxton. Cluxton punched McAteer and knocked him to the ground. Cluxton and McAteer were both sent off.

McAteer has worked in the media for Asia-based ESPN Star Sports. He has also worked on LFC TV.

Honours
Bolton
Football League First Division play-offs: 1995
Football League Cup runner-up: 1994–95

Liverpool
FA Cup runner-up: 1995–96

Individual
PFA Team of the Year: 1993–94 First Division, 1994–95 First Division

See also
 List of Republic of Ireland international footballers born outside the Republic of Ireland

References

External links

 LFChistory.net player profile
 
 

1971 births
Living people
1994 FIFA World Cup players
2002 FIFA World Cup players
Blackburn Rovers F.C. players
Bolton Wanderers F.C. players
Chester City F.C. non-playing staff
Citizens of Ireland through descent
English people of Irish descent
Association football midfielders
Liverpool F.C. players
Marine F.C. players
People from Birkenhead
Premier League players
Republic of Ireland association footballers
Republic of Ireland international footballers
Republic of Ireland B international footballers
Sunderland A.F.C. players
English Football League players
Tranmere Rovers F.C. players
Tranmere Rovers F.C. non-playing staff
FA Cup Final players
English autobiographers
Irish autobiographers